Palín may refer to:

 Palin (game), a traditional game of the Mapuche people
 Palín, Escuintla, municipality in the Escuintla Department of Guatemala
 Palín, Michalovce District, village in the Michalovce District of Slovakia

See also 
 Palin (surname)